Evangelical Free Church of China (EFCC) is a Chinese Protestant denomination historically based in Mainland China and Hong Kong. It is today one of the largest evangelical denominations in Hong Kong.

History 
In 1887, the Swedish American Hans J. von Qualen of the Evangelical Free Church of America became the denomination's first missionary to China. After a short period of language study in Canton, von Qualen established the mission's first chapel in 1888 outside the city of Canton in Henan province as a base for evangelism. By 1925, as the mission developed and had 28 Chinese and Western Christian workers, the mission developed Bible classes which would eventually lead to the establishment of the Canton Bible Institute in 1927, later known as the Evangel Seminary.

It established its first church, Tin Chuen Church, in Hong Kong in 1937. In 1949, a large number of missionaries relocated themselves, along with the Evangel Seminary, south to Hong Kong when there was a change in Chinese political scenery. At the same time, the EFCC Headquarters was also moved to Hong Kong to continue the implementation of its goal.

Doctrine
According to the Holy Bible, EFCC sticks to these 7 basic doctrine.

Believe in one true God, Creator of all things and Lord of the universe, eternally existing in three person, Father, Son and Holy Spirit.
Believe that Jesus Christ is the Son of God, being true God and true man, having been conceived of the Holy spirit and born of the Virgin Mary.  He died on the cross for the atonement of man's iniquities, so that man may be delivered from the condemnation and power of sin.  Further, He arose from dead, ascended into heaven, where at the right hand of the Father He now is the Advocate and High Priest interceding for the saints.  He is also the Head of the Church, and will come visibly again from heaven to establish His kingdom and to judge the living and the dead.
Believe that the Holy Spirit is the third person of the Trinity, who descended on the day of Pentecost to glorify Christ, convict sinners, grant new birth, and to indwell and empower the believers for victories and holy living, and to unite them into one body, the Church of Christ.
Believe that man was created in the image of God but became spiritually dead because of disobedience to God.  Since Adam our fore-father sinned, all have become sinners, living under the wrath of God.  Only through sincere repentance and acceptance of Christ's redemption, cleansing by His blood and regeneration by the Holy Spirit can one enter the Kingdom of God.
Believe in the Scriptures, both Old and New Testaments, to be the inspired Word of God, the living Word of life, wholly truthful and trustworthy, and the final authority for all Christian faith and life.
Believe that all men will be resurrected, the believers to eternal life and heavenly blessings and the unbelievers to eternal death in hell.
Believe that Satan is the Devil, the source of all evils.  He is working in the hearts of disobedient men, and will one day receive eternal punishment.

Organisation
Evangel Seminary
Evangel Children's Home
Evangel Hospital
Evangelical Free Church of China Hong Kong Overseas missions board
Evangel College

Social Service
Elderly centre
Society and family service
Kindergarten
Study room and education centre

Churches
There are 52 churches in Hong Kong Island, Kowloon, The New Territories and Islands District recently. The following churches are listed in the year founded.

Hong Kong Island
5 Ling Chuen Church
11 Christ Church
18 Taikoo Shing Church
20 Kong Fok Church
28 Kornhill Community Church
31 Tung Fook Church
32 International Church
42 Ling Fook Church
50 Aldrich Bay Church

Kowloon

1 Tin Chuen Church
2 Grace Church
3 Wendell Memorial Church
4 Woot Chuen Church
6 Fook Chuen Church
7 Elim Church
8 Canaan Wendell Memorial Church
9 Kwun Tong Church
10 Waterloo Hill Church
12 Joy Church
14 San Po Kong Church
17 Choi Fook Church
21 Shun On Church
23 Wo Ping Church
24 Glorious Grace Church
25 Yan Fook Church
27 Hing Tin Wendell Memorial Church
30 Woot Kei Church
34 Tsim Fook Church
38 Woot Oi Church
40 Lam Tin Church
43 Amazing Grace Church
49 Lok Yan Church
52 Mong Fook Church
54 Spring Church
55 Yan Fook Church (Kowloon East)

The New Territories

13 Tuen Mun Church
15 King Fook Church
16 Hong Fook Church
19 Faith Church
22 Shan Fook Church
26 Fook On Church
29 Po Nga Church
36 Tin Fook Church
39 Abundant Grace Church
41 Tin Yan Church
44 Verbena Height Church
45 Tuen Yan Church
46 Discovery Bay International Community Church
47 The Fountain of Love Church
48 Fook Yat Church
51 Evangel College Wendell Memorial Church
53 On Fook Church

See also

Evangelical Free Church of America

References

 
Religious organizations established in 1888
Protestantism in China
Protestant churches in Hong Kong
Evangelical denominations established in the 19th century
1888 establishments in China
Evangelical denominations in Asia